In geometry, the truncated tetrahexagonal tiling is a semiregular tiling of the hyperbolic plane. There are one square, one decagon, and one dodecagon on each vertex. It has Schläfli symbol of t0,1,2{6,5}. Its name is somewhat misleading: literal geometric truncation of pentahexagonal tiling produces rectangles instead of squares.

Dual tiling

Symmetry
There are four small index subgroup from [6,5] by mirror removal and alternation. In these images fundamental domains are alternately colored black and white, and mirrors exist on the boundaries between colors.

Related polyhedra and tilings 
From a Wythoff construction there are fourteen hyperbolic uniform tilings that can be based from the regular order-5 hexagonal tiling. 

Drawing the tiles colored as red on the original faces, yellow at the original vertices, and blue along the original edges, there are 7 forms with full [6,5] symmetry, and 3 with subsymmetry.

See also 
 Tilings of regular polygons
 List of uniform planar tilings

References
 John H. Conway, Heidi Burgiel, Chaim Goodman-Strass, The Symmetries of Things 2008,  (Chapter 19, The Hyperbolic Archimedean Tessellations)

External links 

 Hyperbolic and Spherical Tiling Gallery
 KaleidoTile 3: Educational software to create spherical, planar and hyperbolic tilings
 Hyperbolic Planar Tessellations, Don Hatch

Hyperbolic tilings
Isogonal tilings
Semiregular tilings
Truncated tilings